Despicable Me is a computer-animated media franchise centering on Gru, a reformed super-villain (who later becomes a father, husband, and secret agent), and his yellow-colored Minions. It is produced by Illumination and distributed by its parent company Universal Pictures.

The franchise began with the 2010 film of the same name, which was followed by two sequels, Despicable Me 2 (2013) and Despicable Me 3 (2017), with a future sequel, Despicable Me 4, expected in 2024; and by two spin-off prequels, Minions (2015) and Minions: The Rise of Gru (2022). The franchise also includes many short films, a television special, several video games, and a theme park attraction. It is the highest-grossing animated film franchise and the 15th highest-grossing film franchise of all time, having grossed over $4.4 billion globally.

Feature films

Main series

Despicable Me (2010)

Longtime supervillain Gru formulates a plan to steal the Moon. Meanwhile, he starts a family by adopting three orphan girls, and must decide where his commitments lie.

Despicable Me debuted at the Annecy International Animated Film Festival on June 9, 2010, and was released in the United States on July 9.

Despicable Me 2 (2013)

Gru is recruited by agent Lucy Wilde, who is investigating a theft of the mutagen called PX-41, stolen from the Arctic Circle. During their investigations, they extract Eduardo Pérez / El Macho, a supervillain with the goal of causing world domination after faking his death.

Despicable Me 2 debuted in Australia on June 5, 2013, and was released in the United States on July 3.

Despicable Me 3 (2017)

Gru teams up with his long-lost twin brother Dru to stop Balthazar Bratt, a former child actor of the 1980s, from destroying Hollywood, Los Angeles, after his show is canceled.

Despicable Me 3 debuted at the Annecy International Animated Film Festival on June 14, 2017, and was theatrically released in the United States on June 30.

Despicable Me 4 (2024)
Illumination CEO Chris Meledandri revealed in an interview in September 2017 that a fourth Despicable Me film is in development. On February 18, 2022, Universal scheduled the film for a July 3, 2024 release.

Prequel series

Minions (2015)

The Minions search for their replaceable evil master after accidentally killing all of those in history.

Minions debuted in London on June 11, 2015, and was released in the United States on July 10.

Minions: The Rise of Gru (2022)

An eleven-year-old Gru plans to become a supervillain with the help of his Minions, which leads to a showdown with a malevolent team, the Vicious 6.

Minions: The Rise of Gru debuted at the Annecy International Animation Film Festival on June 13, 2022, and was released in the United States on July 1.

Short films 
A total of 15 short films have been released in the franchise. Three short films based on Despicable Me were released in December 2010 on the film's DVD and Blu-ray. The Despicable Me 2 DVD and Blu-ray, released in December 2013, included another three short films. Three short films were released in 2015 on the Blu-ray and DVD of Minions, while one short film was released in the Blu-ray and DVD of Despicable Me 3.

A short film titled Mower Minions was released in 2016 with The Secret Life of Pets, being the first short film to be released theatrically. A second theatrical short film was released in 2018 with The Grinch, while another one was released in The Grinch'''s DVD and Blu-ray.

 Home Makeover (2010)
Released on the Despicable Me DVD and Blu-ray.

After the events of Despicable Me, the Minions help Margo, Edith, and Agnes renovate Gru's house, so the social worker does not take the girls back to Miss Hattie's Home for Girls.

 Orientation Day (2010)
Released on the Despicable Me DVD and Blu-ray.

Three new Minions go for bomb-carrying duty, which was harder than they thought when they suddenly have an argument with two others carrying a giant bomb.

 Banana (2010)
Released on the Despicable Me DVD and Blu-ray.

Three Minions fight over a banana. In the process, they wreak havoc in the Minions' workplace.

 Puppy (2013)
Released on the Despicable Me 2 DVD and Blu-ray.

A Minion watches neighbors walking their dogs on the street, which leads him to search for a puppy of his own. After several failed attempts, he comes across a UFO that takes the role of a puppy for him.

 Panic in the Mailroom (2013)
Released on the Despicable Me 2 DVD and Blu-ray.

Two Minions work sending parcels through the lab. When a package containing expired PX-41 (the serum that El Macho used to transform the Minions and himself in Despicable Me 2), gets jammed in the pneumatic delivery system, it transforms one of them into an evil Minion.

 Training Wheels (2013)
Released on the Despicable Me 2 DVD and Blu-ray.

Agnes is unsatisfied with her toy bike after falling off it while attempting to catch up to an ice cream truck with Margo, Edith, and their friends. Three Minions then volunteer to modify the bike and help Agnes improve her skills.

 Binky Nelson Unpacified (2015)
Released on the Minions DVD and Blu-ray.

The Nelsons' youngest son Binky, having lost his pacifier after a successful robbery at a museum, sets out on a mission to retrieve it.

 Competition (2015)
Released on the Minions DVD and Blu-ray.

Two Minions challenge themselves to numerous attacks, ending up on the lab's conveyor belt in the process.

 Cro Minion (2015)
Released on the Minions DVD and Blu-ray.

Two Minions look after a cave baby while their caveman boss goes to find a bull to eat for lunch. But it is harder than the Minions think.

 Mower Minions (2016)
Released theatrically with The Secret Life of Pets (2016).

A group of Minions try to earn some money by mowing a lawn at a local old people's home. But their work results turn out to be chaotic.

 The Secret Life of Kyle (2017)
Released on the Despicable Me 3 DVD and Blu-ray.

After the events of Despicable Me 3, we follow Kyle and his secret life when Gru and his family are gone.

 Yellow is the New Black (2018)
Released theatrically with The Grinch (2018).

Before they all make their big escape from prison in Despicable Me 3, a couple of lucky Minions get a taste of freedom as they break free with the help of one of their fellow human inmates.

 Santa's Little Helpers (2019)
Released on The Grinch DVD and Blu-ray.

Kevin, Stuart, and Bob, having been accidentally dropped off at the North Pole, make the most of the situation by trying to become elves.

 Minion Scouts (2019)
Released on The Secret Life of Pets 2 DVD and Blu-ray.

After being dazzled by the girls, a group of Minions become scouts in an attempt to earn badges.

 Minions & Monsters (2021)
Aired on NBC on June 11, 2021 and included in the Minions: The Rise of Gru DVD and Blu-ray.

A rookie Minion joins other Minions in a tabletop role-playing game.

 Post Modern Minion (2022) 
Released on the Minions: The Rise of Gru DVD and Blu-ray.

When a Minion crashes into an art gallery, an art critic praises his creation and he becomes an overnight celebrity.

Other media
Television specialMinions Holiday Special is a half-hour compilation of Minions mini-movies, containing Santa's Little Helpers, Training Wheels, Puppy, and Minion Scouts. Additionally, the special includes holiday-themed interstitials featuring characters from Illumination's The Secret Life of Pets and Sing franchises. The special aired on NBC on November 27, 2020.

Miranda Cosgrove, who voices Margo in the films, provides narration between the short segments.

Digital seriesSaturday Morning Minions debuted in the United States on Instagram and Facebook pages of Illumination on June 9, 2021, releasing weekly on Saturdays, and consists of 40 episodes. The series features a 2D animation style.

Outside media
Video games
The video game, titled Despicable Me: The Game, was released for the PlayStation 2, PlayStation Portable, and Wii. A Nintendo DS version was released under the name Despicable Me: The Game - Minion Mayhem. Namco also released on July 6, 2010 a version for the iPhone, iPad and iPod Touch platform entitled Despicable Me: Minion Mania, developed by Anino Games. The game was removed from the App Store on January 1, 2013.

The action video game, titled Despicable Me: Minion Rush, was released on June 13, 2013. The game, developed by Gameloft, was adapted for iPhone, iPad, Apple TV, Android, and Windows Phone devices. Played as one of the Minions, it allows customization of the character, who must perform various tasks, including defeating Vector and a new villain created for the game, to earn the title of Minion of the Year. The game was downloaded more than 100 million times in the first three months after its release, and won a British Academy Children's Award in the category BAFTA's Kids' Vote. By June 2021, the game hit 1 billion downloads worldwide across iOS, Android, and other devices.

The free-to-play mobile game developed by Electronic Arts (otherwise known as EA), titled Minions Paradise, was released in the summer of 2015. Playing as Phil, players will help Minions design and build their own utopia set in a tropical environment. The game was removed from the App Store on May 22, 2017.

Theme park attraction

Despicable Me Minion Mayhem is a simulator ride that opened on July 2, 2012, at Universal Studios Florida and on April 12, 2014, at Universal Studios Hollywood, starring Steve Carell as Gru, Miranda Cosgrove as Margo, Dana Gaier as Edith, Elsie Fisher as Agnes, and Pierre Coffin as the Minions. A similar attraction (featuring a Japanese voice cast) opened on April 21, 2017, at Universal Studios Japan.

Characters

Main characters
 Gru (voiced by Steve Carell): The temperamental but usually smart protagonist in the Despicable Me series who speaks with an Eastern European accent. He is the son of Marlena, the twin brother of Dru, the adoptive father of Margo, Edith, and Agnes; husband of Lucy, and the boss of the Minions. At the beginning of the first film, Gru is an ambitious supervillain who constantly seeks approval from his mother, until the adoption of his daughters convinces him that their happiness is important. In the second film, Gru leaves his villainous past behind to care for his daughters, but then soon joins forces - unwillingly - with secret agent Lucy Wilde, whom he later marries. In the third film, after he and Lucy are fired from their jobs at the Anti-Villain League, Gru learns that he has a twin brother, Dru. Along with Lucy and the girls, Gru meets Dru at his mansion in Freedonia, and they form a brotherly relationship over the course of the film. Felonious Gru was originally conceived as a Dracula-like character, but directors Chris Renaud and Pierre Coffin later opted for a villain who would echo "the world of James Bond, thinking of characters like Goldfinger and obviously the Bond-ian world of technology". Gru also bears some similarities with British comic-book character Grimly Feendish, and with the pre-Crisis version of Lex Luthor.
 The Minions (voiced by Pierre Coffin in all films and the theme park attraction, Chris Renaud in the first two films [except spin-offs and attractions], James Arnold Taylor in the 2010 video game, and Jemaine Clement as Jerry the Minion in the first film): Gru's small, yellow, comical henchmen who have one or two eyes. The Minions speak a language that Coffin created by mixing gibberish with words from many languages, including French, English, Spanish, Italian, and Indonesian Although seemingly nonsensical, the English-sounding words are dubbed for every country, in order to make them recognizable. It is shown in Minions that they have existed since the beginning of life on Earth, and desire above all else to serve the most terrible of villains. In the short film "Banana", the Minions are revealed to have an uncontrollable craving for fruits, especially bananas. Mentioned in the films and other media are Kevin, Stuart, Bob, Mel, Otto, Ken, Mike, Dave, Jerry, Carl, Lance, Tom, Phil, Tim, Mark, Jorge, and Norbert.
 The Girls: Three sisters, whom Gru adopts to further his scheme in the first film and gradually comes to love
 Margo (voiced by Miranda Cosgrove): The mature oldest sister. In the first film, among the trio, Margo was the most suspicious of Gru initially; but came to trust him at the end of the film. She is something of a protectress to her sisters. She later takes an interest in boys, which makes Gru overprotective and freeze boys who break her heart.
  Edith (voiced by Dana Gaier): The tomboyish middle sister; the first to enjoy Gru's eclectic possessions, when adopted by him. Practices martial arts in the second film
 Agnes (voiced by Elsie Fisher in the first two films; Nev Scharrel in the third film): The happy-go-lucky youngest sister, and the quickest to trust Gru in the first film. She is presented as an innocent, against her more worldly sisters, and has a strong love for unicorns. In the third film, she "adopts" a one-horned goat whom she names Lucky after mistaking him for a unicorn. Even after learning he was a goat, Agnes continues to love Lucky
 Lucy Wilde (voiced by Kristen Wiig): A cunning secret agent who has teamed up with Gru to hunt down an extremely dangerous supervillain. She loves one-upping Gru with her quirky gadgets and has perfected her own form of martial arts by combining jujitsu, krav maga, Aztec warfare, and krumping. After 147 dates, she marries Gru and becomes the girls' mother.
 Dr. Nefario (voiced by Russell Brand, JB Blanc in the video game): Gru's hearing-impaired inventor and partner-in-crime who speaks with a British accent. He seems to have a romantic interest in Gru's mother, Marlena. In the second film, he misses being a villain so he goes to work for El Macho, but abandons him after he turns the Minions into monsters. He is absent in most of the third film, having accidentally frozen himself in carbonite, similar to that of Han Solo from Star Wars. In Minions: Rise of Gru, it is revealed Nefario previously worked at a record shop called "Criminal Records", which the Vicious 6 use as a cover for their lair before going to work for Gru.
 Dru (voiced by Steve Carell): Gru's charming, happy-go-lucky long-lost twin brother, who is also in the supervillain business. Dru looks just like his brother, only he has blonde hair and wears white attire. He is Lucy's brother-in-law and the adoptive uncle of Margo, Edith, and Agnes
 Marlena (voiced by Julie Andrews): Gru and Dru's mother. Her neglect of Gru's ambitions is identified among the main reasons why he became a supervillain. In the denouement of the first film, she admits to him that he is a better parent than her. Marlena later makes a silent cameo appearance in the second film at Gru and Lucy's wedding. In the third film, Marlena reveals to Gru that after she and Gru and Dru's father divorced, they promised to never see each other again and they each got to take one son with them, with Marlena saying that she got "second pick"
 Fritz (voiced by Steve Coogan): Dru's courteous, well mannered butler who speaks with a British accent. He takes Gru, Lucy, and the girls to meet Dru at his mansion in Freedonia
 Silas Ramsbottom (voiced by Steve Coogan): Director of the Anti-Villain League in the second film. The Minions (and Gru) make fun of his surname. In the third film, he retires from the AVL and is replaced by Valerie Da Vinci as the new Director of the AVL
 Valerie Da Vinci (voiced by Jenny Slate): A ruthless member of the Anti-Villain League who replaces Silas Ramsbottom as Director in the third film. She fires Gru and Lucy due to them failing to capture Balthazar Bratt
  Master Chow (voiced by Michelle Yeoh): A former Kung Fu teacher who now makes a living working at a spa in Minions: The Rise of GruAntagonists
 Victor "Vector" Perkins (voiced by Jason Segel, Jason Harris in the video game): The villain in the first film, Gru's rival, and the son of Mr. Perkins, the President of the Bank of Evil. He was responsible for the theft of the Great Pyramid of Giza and competes against Gru to get ahold of a shrink ray and eventually of the Moon
 Mr. Perkins (voiced by Will Arnett): Vector's father and enormous and equally strong President of the Bank of Evil, responsible for giving out loans to villains in their schemes (formerly including Gru)
 Miss Hattie (voiced by Kristen Wiig): The charismatic but cruel owner of the orphanage from which Gru adopts his daughters. She sends Margo, Edith, and Agnes out to sell cookies and makes them sleep in cardboard boxes if they fail to meet their quota
 Eduardo "El Macho" Pérez (voiced by Benjamin Bratt): A Mexican-accented supervillain in the second film. As El Macho, he was believed to have died after strapping 250 pounds of dynamite on himself and riding a shark into an active volcano. However, it turns out that he actually faked his death, and he became the owner of a Mexican restaurant. He has a son named Antonio, with whom Margo is infatuated at first, until Antonio abandons her. He planned to abduct most of Gru's Minions and turn them into indestructible, evil Minions with a chemical compound he stole called PX-41 and send the mutated Minions to major cities to take over the world
 Balthazar Bratt (voiced by Trey Parker): A supervillain in the third film. A former 1980s child star, he adopts the identity of his supervillain character after the onset of puberty leads to the cancellation of his television series. He is obsessed with 1980s pop culture and uses a giant robot armed with a laser and inflatable bubble gum to exact revenge on Hollywood
 Clive (voiced by Andy Nyman): A robot who acts as Balthazar Bratt's sidekick
 Scarlet Overkill (voiced by Sandra Bullock): In Minions, she is the world's first female super-villain who is bent on becoming the Queen of England, and served as the Minions' boss before Gru
 Herb Overkill (voiced by Jon Hamm): Scarlet's husband and an inventor
 The Vicious 6: A group of six supervillains who appear in Minions: The Rise of Gru. Their members include:
 Belle Bottom (voiced by Taraji P. Henson): A disco-themed femme fatale villain and the newly-appointed leader of the group after Wild Knuckles, who wants to take on the Anti-Villain League
 Jean Clawed (voiced by Jean-Claude Van Damme): A member with a giant mechanical lobster claw for his right arm who speaks in a French accent
 Nun-Chuck (voiced by Lucy Lawless): A nunchuck-wielding nun
 Svengeance (voiced by Dolph Lundgren): A roller skater
 Stronghold (voiced by Danny Trejo): A member with big metal hands
 Wild Knuckles (voiced by Alan Arkin): The former leader of the Vicious 6 who was ousted because of his old age, and later becomes Gru's mentor

Voice cast

Reception
Box office performance
The franchise has grossed a total of more than $4.4 billion, making the Despicable Me franchise the highest-grossing animated film franchise, and the 15th highest-grossing film franchise of all time.

Critical and public response

AccoladesDespicable Me 2 was nominated for the Academy Award for Best Animated Feature, but lost to Frozen. Three Despicable Me'' films were nominated for the Critics' Choice Movie Award for Best Animated Feature. The first and second film were nominated for the Golden Globe Award for Best Animated Feature Film.

References

External links
 

 
American film series
Animated film series
Children's film series
Comedy film franchises
Comedy franchises
Film franchises introduced in 2010
Universal Pictures franchises
Illumination (company) franchises